A flexible work arrangement (FWA) empowers an employee to choose what time they begin to work, where to work, and when they will stop work. The idea is to help manage work-life balance and benefits of FWA can include reduced employee stress and increased overall job satisfaction. On the contrary, some refrain from using their FWA as they fear the lack of visibility can negatively affect their career. Overall, this type of arrangement has a positive effect on incompatible work/family responsibilities, which can be seen as work affecting family responsibilities or family affecting work responsibilities. FWA is also helpful to those who have a medical condition or an intensive care-giving responsibility, where without FWA, part-time work would be the only option.

History 
The idea came from German management consultant, Christel Kammerer in West Germany (1960). It was first implemented by German Aerospace firm, Messarschmilt-Boklow-Blohm in 1967. It was not until the 1970's that FWA practices began in Canada, the United Kingdom, and the United States.

Types of flexible work arrangements

 Flexible working hours
 Remote work 
 Compressed workweek 
 Compressed days
 Phased-in retirement 
 Voluntary reduction of work hours
 Job sharing
 Time made up

Beneficiaries 
Employer:

 Increased employee productivity
 Increased morale/buy-in
 Decreased Absenteeism and presenteeism
 Increased turnover
 less employee payment

Employee:

 Creativity Work Mindset 
 Improved Physical and Mantel Energy
 Work/life balance
 Those with family obligations 
Childcare or elder care
 People in intensive care giving roles
 Those where the only other option is to work part-time.

Arguments against flexible work arrangements

 Key personnel may not be available when needed
 system abuse
 increasing the conflict between work and personal responsibilities
 Decrease or damage to workplace communications

Gender role theory and access to FWA

Gender role theory 
According to gender role theory, society places different roles on women and men simply based on their biological sex (gender-stereotyping). Given the competing forces working-women face between their jobs and home, FWA are made very appealing. FWA also has the ability to encourage men to play a care-giving role as they have equal access to the program. Over the past few years, more women than men using FWA (58% compared with 42%).

Access considerations 
FWA tend to favour those in full-time, salaried positions and male-dominated workplaces or industries. While in the male-dominated workplace, there seems to be equitable access, in female-dominated workplaces, both the women and men are less likely to have schedule control. It is argued this is due to female-dominated workplaces having low-paying roles and unfavourable working conditions.

Policy implications 
-Based on the access considerations, it is argued that the group whom most needs FWA, may not be able to get access to it.

-FWA is important as it is attributed as a variable to help close the Gender pay gap and can assist in maintaining a women's labour market position after giving birth.

-Further research is being conducted by the European Commission (2017), which seeks to identify why an employer may reject a request for a FWA.

-Flexibility can be seen as a substitute as compensation.

Current policy

Canada 

 Budget Implementation Act, 2017, No. 2 (Bill C-63): Amendments made to the Canada Labour Code to give federal employees the right to ask for a FWA.
 No private sector legislation

United Kingdom 

 All employees have the right to make a statutory application
Under the contracts of employment and working hours legislation:
All employees are eligible to flexible working should they have the same employer for 26 weeks or more

United States 

 In 2010, the government passed the Telework Enhancement Act for Federal employees.
 As of 2017, the following FWA bills have been proposed:
Workflex in the 21st Century Act:  Allows employers to choose to offer employers a given number of paid days leave and FWAs. Employers who choose to do this would be rewarded via exemption from local and state bank days. This bill has some controversy as critics feel it would transfer more employee control over to the employer.
Working Families Flexibility Act of 2017 [H.R. 1180]: Enhancement to the Working Families Flexibility Act of 2015 [S.233] by adding a 'time off in lieu' amendment. Critics feel flexibility would be substitute compensation, which comes at the employees expense.
Schedules That Work Act and Flexibility for Working Families Act of 2017: These acts would give people the right to request FWA. This includes the right to alter schedule, hours, and work location.
Overall, FWA are an employer/Employee (or union) agreement
 Not spelled out in the Fair Labor Standards Act of 1938.

References 

Working time
Working conditions